The Brand of Lopez is a 1920 American film directed by Joseph De Grasse and produced by Sessue Hayakawa's Haworth Pictures Corporation. Although the main characters are a matador and an actress, there are no bull fighting or theater scenes portrayed in the film.

Plot
As described in a film magazine, matador Vasco Lopez (Hayakawa) is the idol of Spain. His engagement to actress Lola Castillo (Turner) leads to complications when another man brings her home from the theater. Lopez brands her with his cigarette and stabs her escort, Captain Alvarez (Payne). He then escapes into the mountains and becomes a leader of a band of brigands. Lola obtains a divorce and marries Captain Alvarez. Lopez, seeking revenge, sends his men to abduct Lola, but they bring her younger sister Maria (Ward) instead and Lopez rapes her. She returns to the town and dies a year later, leaving a baby which is exchanged by a nurse for a child of Lola's that dies at birth. Five years later, Lopez surrounds their home and takes Captain Alvarez and the child prisoner, and then orders them shot. He locks himself in a room with Lola. When the nurse confesses the truth of the child's paternity and the police are surrounding the villa, Lopez leaves and sacrifices himself by interjecting himself as the bandits are shooting at Alvarez and his son.

Cast
Sessue Hayakawa as Vasco Lopez
Florence Turner as Lola Castillo
Sidney Payne as Captain Alvarez
Evelyn Ward as Maria Castillo
Eugenie Besserer as Señora Castillo
Gertrude Norman as Marianna
Kitty Bradbury as Señora Lopez

References

External links

 

1920 films
American silent feature films
American black-and-white films
Haworth Pictures Corporation films
1920 drama films
Films directed by Joseph De Grasse
Silent American drama films
Film Booking Offices of America films
1920s American films
Films with screenplays by Richard Schayer
Bullfighting films
Films set in Spain
Films about rape